Riccardo Annibaleschi della Molara (1634–1689) was a Roman Catholic prelate who served as Bishop of Veroli (1675–1689).

Biography
Riccardo Annibaleschi della Molara was born in Rome, Italy in 1634.
On 19 Mar 1675, he was ordained a deacon and on 31 Mar 1675 he was ordained a priest.
On 27 May 1675, he was appointed during the papacy of Pope Clement X as Bishop of Veroli.
On 3 Jun 1675, he was consecrated bishop by Francesco Nerli (iuniore), Archbishop of Florence. 
He served as Bishop of Veroli until his death in Mar 1689.

References

External links and additional sources
 (for Chronology of Bishops) 
 (for Chronology of Bishops) 

17th-century Italian Roman Catholic bishops
Bishops appointed by Pope Clement X
1634 births
1689 deaths